John Buckley (born 14 July 1956) is a South African cricketer. He played in two List A and seven first-class matches for Border in 1979/80 and 1980/81.

See also
 List of Border representative cricketers

References

External links
 

1956 births
Living people
South African cricketers
Border cricketers
Cricketers from East London, Eastern Cape